Infanta Isabel was a  unprotected cruiser of the Spanish Navy.

Technical characteristics

Infanta Isabel was built at the naval shipyard at Cadiz. Her keel was laid in 1883 and the ship was launched on 24 June 1885. The vessel was completed in 1887. She had one rather tall funnel. Infanta Isabel had an iron hull and was rigged as a barque.

Visit to the United States
In May 1893 Infanta Eulalia visited the United States; she traveled first to Puerto Rico, then to Havana, Cuba, arriving in New York on 18 May on the Infanta Isabel, before making her way to Washington, D.C., where she was received by President Grover Cleveland at the White House. The Infanta Isabel stayed on in New York as a part of the Grand Naval Review there.

In early January 1903, Infanta Isabel was sent to Morocco, to protect Spanish citizens and interests during the unrest there.

Infanta Isabel was rebuilt in 1911, and by 1921 her armament had become one  and ten  guns and her complement had risen to 194.  She was stricken in 1927, by far the longest-lived ship of her class.

References

Chesneau, Roger, and Eugene M. Kolesnik, Eds. Conway's All The World's Fighting Ships 1860–1905. New York, New York: Mayflower Books Inc., 1979. .
Gray, Randal, Ed. Conway's All The World's Fighting Ships 1906–1921. Annapolis, Maryland: Naval Institute Press, 1985. .

External links
 Department of the Navy: Naval Historical Center: Online Library of Selected Images: Spanish Navy Ships: Infanta Isabel (Cruiser, 1885–1926)

Velasco-class cruisers
Ships built in Spain
1885 ships